Serge Fuster (pen name "Casamayor"; 28 November 1911 in Algiers, French Algeria – 29 October 1988 in Paris ) was a French judge and writer. He wrote over twenty books, primarily essays on justice.

During World War II, in 1940, Fuster was a lieutenant in Sedan. When the war ended, Fuster participated in the Nuremberg Trials, as part of the French delegation, led by Edgar Faure and François de Menthon.

Beginning in the 1950s Fuster began writing for the journal Esprit under the nom-de-plume of "Casamayor", a name he would use for the next thirty years.

Fuster ended his judicial career as President of the Chamber at the Court of Appeal of Versailles. Upon his death, he was given many tributes, including ones by President François Mitterrand, Prime Minister Michel Rocard, and Justice Pierre Arpaillange.

Selected works

Non-fiction

Fiction

References

1911 births
1988 deaths
People from Algiers
20th-century French non-fiction writers
20th-century French judges
20th-century French male writers
20th-century pseudonymous writers
Migrants from French Algeria to France